Baek Hyun-joo (Korean:백현주; born on 22 May 1970) is a South Korean actress. She is alumni of Sogang University, Department of Sociology. She made her acting debut in 2006, since then, she has appeared in number of plays, films and television series. She is known for her roles in The King: Eternal Monarch (2020), Hello, Me! (2021) and The King's Affection (2021). She has acted in films such as: Sunny Again Tomorrow (2018) and Love and Leashes (2022) among others.

Career
Baek Hyun-joo is a graduate in Sociology from Sogang University. She is affiliated to the talent company 'Big Boss Entertainment'. She was first seen on big screen in the 2006 film Family Matters, and then in the films The Last Dining Table and A Big Tiny Step. She made her drama debut in a 2015 web-based comic series Songgot: The Piercer.

In 2020 Baek was cast in SBS fantasy drama The King: Eternal Monarch as Secretary Mo alongside Lee Min-ho and Kim Go-eun.

In 2021 she was seen in Hello, Me! playing a villain Han Ji-sook, the executive director of Joa Confectionart. Her performance was appreciated for her "delicate inner acting". In the same year she appeared in tvN's healing drama You Are My Spring as nurse  Oh Mi-kyung.

Filmography

Films

Television series

Theater

References

External links
 Official website
 
 Baek Hyun-joo on Daum 
 Baek Hyun-joo on Play DB

21st-century South Korean actresses
South Korean film actresses
South Korean television actresses
Living people
1970 births
Sogang University alumni